Ultrablessed (Stylized as ULTRABLESSED) is the 5th studio album of the Pinoy rock band Sponge Cola under Universal Records. The album is composed of 11 tracks, and it was released on January 31, 2014. This album shows the journey and friendship of the members of the band for the past 10 years and also shows some new and fresh musical arrangements and quality which shows the showmanship of Sponge Cola. The first single from the album is "Kailangan Kita".
The deluxe edition was bundled with a maximum capacity DVD for a limited release. On 2015, Ultrablessed Thank You Edition was released on February 14, 2015.

Track listing

Bonus track

Thank You Edition

Maximum Capacity Concert

Personnel
Yael Yuzon - vocals, rhythm guitar
Gosh Dilay - bass guitar, backup vocals
Erwin Armovit - lead guitar
Tmac Cruz - drums

Release history

References

2014 albums
Sponge Cola albums